The Team event tournament of the 2013 BWF World Junior Championships was the fifteenth tournament of the BWF World Junior Championships. It was held from October 23–27, 2013 in Bangkok, Thailand. According to the Badminton World Federation (BWF) 32 teams have confirmed their participation. The winner of the tournament would have Suhandinata Cup for about a year until the next BWF World Junior Championships Team Event is held.

Seedings
The seedings for teams competing in the tournament were released on October 11, 2013. It was based on aggregated points from the best players in the world junior ranking. The tournament was divided into four groups, with China and South Korea were the two top seeds, and 2 teams (Indonesia and Japan) in the seeded 3-4 were also put into the same group. another 4 teams were put in the second groups. Eight teams (seeded 9-16) were seeded into third groups and the last sixteen teams were seeded into last groups. The draw was held on the same day in Kuala Lumpur.

Group 1 (Seeded 1-4)

Group 2 (Seeded 5-8)

Group 3 (Seeded 9-16)

Group 4 (Seeded 17-32)

Group stage

Group W1

Group W2

Group X1

Group X2

Group Y1

Group Y2

Group Z1

Group Z2

Knockout stage

Final

Indonesia vs South Korea

Final team ranking

 [2]
 [3/4]
 [1]
 [3/4]
 [5/8]
 [5/8]
 [5/8]
 [9/16]
 [5/8]
 [9/16]
 [9/16]
 [9/16]
 [9/16]
 [9/16]
 [9/16]
 
 [9/16]
 
 
 
 
 
 
 
 
 
 
 

 (Withdrew)
 (Withdrew)

See also
2013 BWF World Junior Championships – Team event playoffs stage

References

Teams
World Junior